Nihar Mukherjee (1920–2010) was an Indian politician who served as General Secretary of the Socialist Unity Centre of India (Communist) (SUCI (C)). He was a founding member of the party in 1948 and became the General Secretary after the death of Shibdas Ghosh in 1976. He was also the Editor-in-Chief of the Proletarian Era, the official newspaper of the organization.

During Mukherjee's early political career, he was a leader of the Anushilan Samiti. He was jailed during the Quit India movement. Nihar Mukherjee died of cardiac arrest on 18 February 2010 in Kolkata. The party held a massive memorial meeting on 3 March 2010 to mourn the death of Nihar Mukherjee in the Netaji Indoor Stadium, Kolkata.

References

Socialist Unity Centre of India (Communist) politicians
Bengali Hindus
2010 deaths
Indian atheists
Stalinism
Anti-revisionists
Indian political writers
Anushilan Samiti
1920 births
Indian male writers
Indian Communist writers
20th-century Indian writers
West Bengal politicians
20th-century Bengalis
Indian newspaper editors
Indian male journalists
Journalists from West Bengal